Halalkalicoccus  (common abbreviation Hac.) is a genus of the Halobacteriaceae.

References

Further reading

Scientific journals

Scientific books

Scientific databases

External links

Archaea genera